is a paranormal phenomenon or yōkai from Japanese folklore. Little is known of the origin of umibōzu but it is a sea-spirit and as such has multiple sightings throughout Japan. Normally, umibōzu appears to sailors on calm seas which quickly turn tumultuous. It either breaks the ship on emergence or demands a bucket or barrel from the sailors and proceeds to drown them. The only safe way to escape an umibōzu is to give it a bottomless barrel and sail away while it is confused.

Concept
They appear and disappear in the oceans, often at night, and it is thought that they would suddenly appear on what was previously a calm sea surface as a giant's black bōzu head and destroy ships. They are often a few meters (yards) to a few tens of meters (yards) in length, so they are seen as quite large, but there are also tales about relatively small ones.

Like funayūrei, there are often many tales that seem to be about hallucinations, and often the difference between them is not clear. They would say "lend me a ladle," and sometimes the funayūrei that come to sink ships are considered the same as umibōzu. However, unlike the funayūrei who come with stormy weather, umibōzu sometimes appear at seas with no abnormalities (and in this case, once the umibōzu was seen, the weather would start getting stormy), so it's pointed out that these could be things that actually exist that were seen incorrectly. Some examples of things that could have been seen incorrectly include sea organisms, cumulonimbus clouds, big waves, and other natural phenomena.

Also, umibōzu would often come in swarms as naked bōzu-like beings and attack ships, and they would do things like cling on to the hull and scull as well as put out the basket fire. It is said that they would sometimes let out a voice saying "yaa yaa" while swimming, and when hit with the scull would let out shrieks of "aitata". Their weakness is tobacco smoke, and it is said that if one is unlucky enough to encounter one, having one of those ready can lead to being saved.

Legends by area
In the Tōhoku region, there is a custom of sacrificing to the gods the first fish caught when fishing, and it is said that if this is not followed, an umibōzu would appear and destroy the boat and kidnap the boat owner.

The nurarihyon that appears often in Bisan Seto has a large round head and as they float towards the boat, they would then slowly sludge (nurari) away and then unexpectedly (hyon) float approaching the boat again. They would do this several times over to mess with people.

In Cape Shiriya, Higashidōri, Shimokita District, Aomori Prefecture, it is said that people eaten by sharks would become "mōjabune". They can be repelled by melting some miso and letting it into the sea. The "umikozō" told about in the Kamo District, Shizuoka Prefecture is a boy covered with hair all the way to the sides of the eye, and it is said that they would approach fishing lines with a grin. Also, in Mikonohama, Kii Province, a small animal called the "mokuri kokuri" that resembles a weasel would go to the mountains on March 3 and to the sea on May 5, and they have the shape of a human, but would expand and contract at will and disappear as soon as they appear, and extract from the butts of people who come to wheat fields at night. They have a jellyfish-like shape, and are said to come floating in swarms above the ocean. During the Mongol invasions, they were considered to be the spirits of those who died in water, and their name was ateji for Mongolian Koguryo. In the Kitauwa District, Ehime Prefecture, the sea would become white at night and a "shirami", also called "shirami yūren", would come swimming, and fishers would call these idiots. However, it is said that if they hear "idiot", they'd get angry and cling on to the scull and give a bad time. On Sado Island, the "tateboshi" are a monster said to stand at a height of  who would aim at ships and try to flip them over.

Umibōzu are also said to change their appearance, and in Kesennuma Ōshima, Miyagi Prefecture, there are tales of them shapeshifting into a beautiful woman and engaging in swimming contests with humans. There is also a similar tale in Iwate, but there it is said that those who accept the challenge would be swallowed down instantly. In Uwajima, Ehime Prefecture, there are tales where they would shapeshift into a zatō (blind person) and kill human women. Also, while there are many legends of them attacking humans, in Uwajima there is the legend that those who see an umibōzu would live a long life.

There are also umibōzu with strange appearances. In Wakayama Prefecture, something called the "umibōzu of Kemiura" would appear and disappear. It is said to have had brown hair, orange eyes, and had the mouth of a crocodile, the torso of a fish, the tail of a lobster, and the cry of a bull.

In Nagano Prefecture, there are umibōzu who live in rivers, unusual through all provinces. According to legend, they live in rivers near Kaesa, Nakano, and had giant bodies and black heads that looked like big Buddha statues. Only their upper bodies were said to be above water.

Outside Japan, there are half-human legends about sea monks and sea bishops.

In classical literature
According to the essay, the Kansō Jigo (閑窓自語) of the Kansei era, in Kaizuka, Izumi (now Kaizuka, Osaka Prefecture), an umibōzu would rise up and stay above ground for 3 days, and children were warned not to go out until it returned to the sea.

In the essay Usō Kanwa (雨窓閑話), in Kuwana (now Mie Prefecture), it was said that umibōzu would appear at the end of the month so it was forbidden to set sail during that time, but it is said that one sailor broke this ban and went out to sea whereupon an umibōzu appeared and asked, "am I fearsome?" to which the sailor answered, "there is nothing as fearsome as navigating through the whole world," at which the umibōzu disappeared. Similarly, there is a legend about a "zatō gashira" (blind man head), a blind bōzu that appears above the sea, and it would ask people "am I fearsome?" and if one acts scared by saying "I'm scared" or "please help", it would say "you should not be going out to sea at the end of the month" and disappear.

In the Kii Zōdan Shū of the Edo Period are statements about umibōzu called "kuro nyūdō" (black priest initiates). A boat was going Ise Province (now Mie Prefecture) to Cape Irago and a boatman named Zenchi refused to have "just one woman" on, so he forcefully took his wife on the boat, and it encountered a large storm. The shipowner believed that the dragon god was angered, at least in part due to the women on board, and despite throwing into the sea things that he thought a dragon might like, the storm still did not calm, and finally the kuro nyūdō appeared. It is said that Zenchi's wife made her resolve and tossed herself into the ocean, and the kuro nyūdō gulped down that woman, upon which the storm stopped. These umibōzu are said to be fallen dragon gods who would demand sacrifice.

In the Haidaoyizhi (海島逸志) by Wang Dahai, under the name of "umi oshō" (sea priest), it was written to be a yōkai resembling a human but has a tear from mouth to ear, and would make a big laughter upon finding a human. Umi oshō are said to be feared because when they appear, a storm surge always follows. It is also theorized that these are sea turtles seen as yōkai.

Also, in Yura, Awaji Island (now Sumoto), it is said that one can be spared by tossing the most precious cargo into the sea.

Recent sightings
In April 1971, off the coast of Onagawa, Oshika District, Miyagi Prefecture, a fishing boat, the 28th Konpira Maru, was travelling to New Zealand to fish for tuna, when the boat's long line was suddenly cut, and a large creature surfaced from the water. Half its body was submerged in murky water so its whole body could not be ascertained, but it was said to leave a trail. It is said that as they got ready to poke it with a harpoon, the monster disappeared into the sea.

When an officer of the research lab, the Enyō Suisan Kenkyujo, at branch office in Yaizu heard of this account, he supposed that it was likely that the fishermen were mistaking an organism, like a fish or whale, for a monster.

These accounts of strange events were published in Mainichi Shimbun on July 17 of the same year.

Similar creatures
In China, there is the legend of the kikokutan (鬼哭灘) no kai, and according to research, it is said to be related to Japan's funayūrei and umibōzu, but it has a different appearance. It is thought that when a boat goes on the sea above a kikokutan, its appearance was described by the words 没頭, without a head, 隻手, having one hand, and 独足, having one leg, and it was short, and the bald monster would attempt to overturn the ship (on having no hair, this part of their appearance is the same).

Origin 
The origin of umibōzu is unclear as there are no stories specifically referencing what caused its creation or its first appearance. One theory about the origin of umibōzu is that they are the spirits of dead priests who were thrown into the ocean by Japanese villagers for some reason or another. Because their bodies have nowhere to be laid to rest, their souls inhabit the oceans and haunt it in the shape of a dark shadow, reaping its revenge upon any souls unlucky enough to come across it.

Physical attributes 
In the early Edo period scroll Bakemono no e, umibōz is shown to have a shaved, smooth head and appears to be all black but it also looks like a mix between a dog and possibly a sea serpent and an octopus (see image). Its arms end in what resembles hand made up of five tentacle-like appendages constituting a hand. It also has a longer body with fins running down its spine as the lower body disappears underwater, once again obscuring our view of its lower body and continuing the mystery of what its lower body looks like. Similar to most legends, the eyes are opened wide and it is smiling. There are two tentacle-like appendages coming from its face which could be feelers of some sort. This is the only occurrence of these feelers and they do not appear in any other legends or accounts.

The presence or sighting of an umibōzu is widespread and not an uncommon occurrence. Physically, it is often represented as a large, black humanoid figure which only ever rises from the ocean to about its waist, never revealing its lower half. According to most accounts, no one knows what the lower half of an umibōzu looks like and thus this figure is shrouded in mystery. Some posit it has tentacles like an octopus while others suggest it is purely humanoid and has two legs like the monks and Buddhas it resembles. The sheer size of the yōkai helps it to drown the sailors and break the ships it comes upon in the seas. Some stories claim an umibōzu can break a ship in half with its hands or by swinging its arms. The body is jet black like that of a shadow with a shaved, smooth head like those of the monks and Buddhas of Japan. This is the only tie to Buddhism or any type of religion in most umibōzu legends which seems strange. Normally, if a yōkai looks a certain way it is to accomplish something specific to the spirit but umibōzu seems to have no ties to Buddhism in anything beyond its appearance. Some accounts suggest umibōzu appear to be praying and constantly smiling while their two, round eyes are opened wide in a constant stare. One common theme in every account is the eyes which seem to pierce the sailors and stands out in stark contrast with the black void of its skin. Some accounts suggest umibōzu has two arms like a human and others suggest they resemble tentacles like that of an octopus.

Manifestations 
Umibōzu always appear only in the ocean, usually during peaceful waters and fair weather. These fair conditions would normally put the sailors at ease as they are literally "sailing on smooth waters" but the possible presence of a malicious spirit put many sailors on edge in these times of peaceful sailing. Upon its sudden rising from the ocean, causing waves and sometimes flipping ships or breaking them with its emergence, umibōzu is accompanied by the winds begin to blow and waves toss the ship about. The appearance of an umibōzu alone causes this dramatic shift in weather which puts any ship in immediate peril, not only from being capsized by the waves but also from being crushed by the yōkai. This could be a mixing of the funayūrei legends which suggests these yōkai appear during storms at sea. With very few first person sightings which are recorded or passed on, umibōzu tends to have characteristics with other yōkai. Similar to the funayūrei, umibōzu either breaks the ship with its arms or it demands a barrel from the sailors which it consequently uses to drown the sailors by scooping up water and dumping it into the ships deck. Funayūrei use ladles to drown sailors in some Japanese legends while some accounts of umibōzu claim it appears with a ladle for the same purpose. The only way to escape from an umibōzu safely is to give it a bottomless barrel, such that it cannot scoop up water, thereby giving the sailors a chance to escape. While it is confused and attempting to scoop up the water in a futile effort, the sailors have just enough time to sail away to safety. The yōkai seems to be foolish in the way it does not understand why it cannot scoop water with the bottomless barrel, possibly showing the superiority of humans over yōkai in general. Normally, a chance encounter with umibōzu is deadly for all and as such there are very few instances of first-person accounts of an umibōzu encounter. Any survivors of such an encounter are due to their giving a bottomless barrel or if there were a shipwreck survivor adrift in the ocean who washed ashore.
 Usually called the "sea monk" (umi means sea and bōzu means monk), umibōzu has no ties to religion in any of its actions or sightings. Victims of this yōkai are random and have no ties to any action or belief. Sailors who were attacked were of no specific sect or religion as they are only ever described as pitiable sailors, the victims of an attack.

See also
 Sea Draugr
 Sea monk

Footnotes

Explanatory footnotes

Citation footnotes

References
 Allardice, Pamela. Myths, Gods, and Fantasy: A Sourcebook. Dorset: Prism Press, 1991. p. 209.
 
 The Obakemono Project

Japanese folklore
Mythological aquatic creatures
Yōkai
Mythological monsters
Undead
Japanese giants
Japanese ghosts
Piscine and amphibian humanoids